The 2014–15 Illinois Fighting Illini men's basketball team represented the University of Illinois at Urbana–Champaign in the 2014–15 NCAA Division I men's basketball season. Led by third-year head coach John Groce, the Illini played their home games at State Farm Center in Champaign, Illinois as members of the Big Ten Conference. They finished the season 19–14, 9–9 in Big Ten play to finish in a tie for seventh place. They lost in the second round of the Big Ten tournament to Michigan. They received an invitation to the National Invitation Tournament where they lost in the first round to Alabama.

Previous season 
The Illini finished the 2013–14 season 20–15, 7–11 in Big Ten play to finish in a tie for eighth place. They received a bid to the NIT where they advanced to the second round before losing to Clemson.

Offseason

Departures

2015 recruiting class 
Leron Black joined the Fighting Illini as the first recruit from the Memphis, Tennessee area since the 1997–98 season when Cory Bradford suited up for the Fighting Illini. Black is the reigning Tennessee Mr. Basketball and is Illinois' highest rated recruit since Portland Trail Blazers Forward-center Meyers Leonard.

Michael Finke joins Rayvonte Rice as the second player on the Fighting Illini roster from Centennial High School in Champaign, Illinois. Finke also follows the footsteps of his father, Jeff Finke, who lettered in basketball as a forward for the 1986–87 Illinois Fighting Illini men's basketball team and then lettered in football as a tight end for the Fighting Illini from 1988–1990.

Walk-ons

2016 recruiting class
On March 5, 2015 Illinois signee Jalen Coleman-Lands was named one of 26 high school seniors who will participate in the Jordan Brand Classic on April 17, 2015, at the Barclays Center in Brooklyn, New York. Coleman-Lands is the second Illini to be selected to play in the Jordan Classic, joining Dee Brown who played for the Red team in 2002.

Roster

Depth chart

Regular season

Injuries
On September 11, it was announced that senior point guard Tracy Abrams suffered a torn ACL to his right knee during preseason workouts which will cause him to miss the entire 2014–15 season. The injury forced Abrams to use a medical redshirt so he can return for the 2015–16 season. After an 0–2 start to Big Ten Conference play, it was announced on January 6 that redshirt senior guard Rayvonte Rice suffered a broken bone in his left hand during practice and would be sidelined indefinitely. At the time of his injury, Rice was Illinois' leader in scoring, rebounds, and steals. Illinois suffered another injury that was announced prior to their game against Purdue at home on January 21. Redshirt junior guard Aaron Cosby suffered a retinal tear after being poked in the eye in his left eye during a home loss to Indiana. Cosby underwent laser surgery to repair the tear, which will sideline him up to two weeks.

Student-manager turned walk-on
On January 23, 2014 head coach John Groce announced the addition of former student-manager Ryan Schmidt to the roster as a walk-on guard after a string of injuries at the position. Schmidt is a senior from Bloomington, Illinois and played high school basketball at Bloomington Central Catholic.

Aaron Cosby
On February 20, 2015 coach Groce announced that he and redshirt junior guard Aaron Cosby have mutually decided to part ways. Cosby had not played in over a month since suffering an injury to his left eye against Indiana on January 18. While recovering from his injury, he and Rayvonte Rice were indefinitely suspended from play due to a violation of team rules on January 31. Rice returned from suspension in a home win against Michigan, however Cosby remained suspended. Despite no longer being on the roster, Cosby intends to remain enrolled at Illinois and then transfer to another school after graduating in May. Cosby previously played his first two years for Seton Hall and sat out during the 2013–14 season after transferring to Illinois.

2004-05 national runner-up anniversary
On December 5, 2014, Illinois announced they would be releasing commemorative bobbleheads to celebrate the ten-year anniversary of the 2004-05 Fighting Illini team. The 2004-05 team finished the season as the 2005 National Runner-up with a 37–2 record, which tied the NCAA record for most wins in a season. During weeknight Big Ten Conference play at home, Illinois will release a bobblehead of the starting lineup of Deron Williams, Dee Brown, Luther Head, Roger Powell, Jr., and James Augustine.

Schedule and results

|-
!colspan=12 style="background:#; color:#;"|Exhibition

|-
!colspan=12 style="background:#; color:#;"|Non-conference regular season

|-
!colspan=9 style="background:#"|Big Ten regular season

|-
!colspan=9 style="background:#"|Big Ten tournament

|-
!colspan=9 style="background:#"|NIT

Honors and awards
On March 9, 2015, The Big Ten Conference announced most of its conference awards.

References

Illinois
Illinois Fighting Illini men's basketball seasons
Illinois
Illinois
Illinois